Mozilla VPN is an open-source virtual private network web browser extension, desktop application, and mobile application developed by Mozilla. It launched in beta as Firefox Private Network on September 10, 2019, and officially launched on July 15, 2020, as Mozilla VPN.


History
The free, limited-use Firefox Private Network web browser extension beta version was released on September 10, 2019, as part of the relaunch of Mozilla's Test Pilot Program, a program that allowed Firefox users to test experimental new features which had been shuttered in January 2019. The beta of the subscription-based standalone virtual private network for Android, Microsoft Windows, and Chromebook launched on February 19, 2020, with the iOS version following soon after.

Firefox Private Network was rebranded as "Mozilla VPN" on June 18, 2020, and officially launched as Mozilla VPN on July 15, 2020. At launch, Mozilla VPN was available in six countries (the United States, Canada, the United Kingdom, Singapore, Malaysia, and New Zealand) for Windows 10, Android, and iOS (beta). As planned, the service also launched in Germany and France in April 2021.

Cybersecurity firm Cure53 conducted a security audit for Mozilla VPN in August 2020 and identified multiple vulnerabilities, including one critical-severity vulnerability. In March 2021, Cure53 conducted a second security audit, which noted significant improvements since the 2020 audit. The second audit identified multiple issues, including two medium-severity and one high-severity vulnerability, but concluded that by the time of publication, only one vulnerability remained unresolved, and that it would require "a strong state-funded attacker-model" to be exploitable. Mozilla disclosed most of the vulnerabilities in July 2021 and released the full report by Cure53 in August 2021.

Features
Mozilla VPN masks the user's IP address, hides location data from the websites accessed by the user, and encrypts all network activity. A limited-monthly-use free version is available as a web browser extension for the Firefox browser, and a paid version for all device activity is available on the mobile operating systems iOS and Android and the desktop operating systems Microsoft Windows, macOS and Linux. The paid version of Private Network uses the Swedish Mullvad VPN service, which uses the WireGuard VPN standard, while the free version uses the American Cloudflare service. It also comes with Custom DNS servers and Multi-hop.

Availability

Mozilla VPN is available to subscribe in Austria, Belgium, Canada, Finland, France, Germany, Ireland, Italy, Malaysia, the Netherlands, New Zealand, Singapore, Spain, Sweden, Switzerland, the UK, and the US to connect to servers in 30+ countries.

See also 

 Dynamic Multipoint Virtual Private Network
 Ethernet VPN
 Internet privacy
 Mediated VPN
 Virtual private server
 VPN service

References

Firefox
Free and open-source software
Free Firefox WebExtensions
Mozilla
Software using the Mozilla license
Mobile applications
IOS software
Internet properties established in 2020